Sasha Goodlett (born August 9, 1990) is an American professional basketball player who last played for the Halcones de Xalapa Femenil of the LNBPF LIGA NACIONAL DE BALONCESTO PROFESIONAL FEMENIL.  Born in Bolton, Mississippi, she played at Georgia Institute of Technology and Clinton High School.

Georgia Tech statistics
Source

References

External links
WNBA stats
Georgia Tech Yellow Jackets bio

1990 births
Living people
American expatriate basketball people in China
American women's basketball players
Basketball players from Jackson, Mississippi
Centers (basketball)
Chicago Sky players
Georgia Tech Yellow Jackets women's basketball players
Heilongjiang Dragons players
Indiana Fever draft picks
Indiana Fever players